, i.e. Fuji View Hill Station, is a railway station on the Keio Inokashira Line in Suginami, Tokyo, Japan, operated by the private railway operator Keio Corporation.

Lines

Service pattern
Only all-stations "Local" services stop at this station. During the daytime, there are eight services per hour in either direction.

Layout 

The station consists of a single ground-level island platform serving two tracks. The station has an above-track station building. Construction of the current station building began in March 2010, and was completed in December of the same year. There are elevators and escalators between the station building concourse and platform, and to the ground level at the north and south exits (though there is no escalator between the station building and ground level at the south exit).

The underground passage that was previously used to connect to the old station building until December 2010 has been maintained as a free passageway for pedestrians to cross the tracks on the south side.

Also to the west of the station is an interchange between the two lines of tracks allowing trains to move from the Shibuya-bound tracks to Kichijoji-bound tracks and vice versa. Because trains are stabled at the depot overnight, there are some morning trains which run from this station to Shibuya.

The toilets are on the second floor, inside the ticket gates. These include multi-purpose toilets.

Platforms

History
The station opened on 1 August 1933.

From 22 February 2013, station numbering was introduced on Keio lines, with Fujimigaoka Station becoming "IN13".

Passenger statistics
In fiscal 2011, the station was used by an average of 13,370 passengers daily.

The passenger figures for previous years are as shown below.

References

External links

 Fujimigaoka Station information (Keio) 

Railway stations in Tokyo
Railway stations in Japan opened in 1933